Menal is a village in Begun Taluk in Chittorgarh district in Rajasthan, India.

References 

Villages in Chittorgarh district